The Natick class is a class of harbor tugboats that have been active since the 1960s. Members of the class are named for Native American peoples and their members,  excepted. , five to eight Natick-class tugs remain in active service. Members of this class were designed under project SCB 147A.

In active service

Other

See: Neodesha (IX-540), a non-operational training hulk.

References 

 

Auxiliary ship classes of the United States Navy